The Art of War is a treatise by the Italian Renaissance political philosopher and historian Niccolò Machiavelli.

The format of The Art of War is a socratic dialogue. The purpose, declared by Lord Fabrizio Colonna (perhaps Machiavelli's persona) at the outset, "To honor and reward virtù, not to have contempt for poverty, to esteem the modes and orders of military discipline, to constrain citizens to love one another, to live without factions, to esteem less the private than the public good." To these ends, Machiavelli notes in his preface, the military is like the roof of a palazzo protecting the contents.

Written between 1519 and 1520 and published the following year, it was Machiavelli's only historical or political work printed during his lifetime, though he was appointed official historian of Florence in 1520 and entrusted with minor civil duties.

Format
The Art of War is divided into a preface (proemio) and seven books (chapters), which take the form of a series of dialogues that take place in the Orti Oricellari, the gardens built in a classical style by Bernardo Rucellai in the 1490s for Florentine aristocrats and humanists to engage in discussion, between Cosimo Rucellai and "Lord Fabrizio Colonna" (many feel Colonna is a veiled disguise for Machiavelli himself, but this view has been challenged by scholars such as Mansfield), with other patrizi and captains of the recent Florentine republic: Zanobi Buondelmonti, Battista della Palla and Luigi Alamanni. The work is dedicated to Lorenzo di Filippo Strozzi, patrizio fiorentino in a preface which ostentatiously pronounces Machiavelli's authorship. After repeated uses of the first person singular to introduce the dialogue, Machiavelli retreats from the work, serving as neither narrator nor interlocutor. Fabrizio is enamored with the Roman Legions of the early to mid Roman Republic and strongly advocates adapting them to the contemporary situation of Renaissance Florence.

Fabrizio dominates the discussions with his knowledge, wisdom and insights. The other characters, for the most part, simply yield to his superior knowledge and merely bring up topics, ask him questions or for clarification. These dialogues, then, often become monologues with Fabrizio detailing how an army should be raised, trained, organized, deployed and employed.

Background
Machiavelli's Art of War echoes many themes, issues, ideas and proposals from his earlier, more widely read works, The Prince and The Discourses. To the contemporary reader, Machiavelli's dialogue may seem impractical and to under-rate the effectiveness of both firearms and cavalry. However, his theories were not merely based on a thorough study and analysis of classical and contemporary military practices. Machiavelli had served for fourteen years as secretary to the Chancery of Florence and "personally observed and reported back to his government on the size, composition, weaponry, morale, and logistical capabilities of the most effective militaries of his day." However, the native fighting force he assiduously oversaw was struck a catastrophic defeat in Prato in 1512 which led to the downfall of the Florentine republican government.

Military strategy and science
Machiavelli wrote that war must be expressly defined. He developed the philosophy of "limited warfare"—that is, when diplomacy fails, war is an extension of politics. Art of War also emphasizes the necessity of a state militia and promotes the concept of armed citizenry. He believed that all society, religion, science, and art rested on the security provided by the military.

Critique
However at the time he was writing, firearms, both technologically and tactically, were in their infancy and the overwhelming of enemy missile-armed troops, of artillery even, between salvos, by a charge of pikes and sword and shield men would have been a viable tactic. In addition Machiavelli was not writing in a vacuum; Art of War was written as a practical proposition to the rulers of Florence as an alternative to the unreliable condottieri mercenaries upon which all the Italian city states were reliant. A standing army of the prosperous and pampered citizens that would have formed the cavalry would have been little better. Machiavelli therefore "talks up" the advantages of a militia of those arms that Florence could realistically muster and equip from her own resources.

However, his basic notion of emulating Roman practices was slowly and pragmatically adapted by many later rulers and commanders, most notably Maurice of Nassau
and Gustavus Adolphus of Sweden. They would lay the foundations for the system of linear tactics which would dominate the warfare of Europe and the world until after the Napoleonic Wars.

While Machiavelli's influence as a military theorist is often given a back seat to his writings as a political philosopher, that he considered Dell'arte della guerra to be his most important work is clear from his discussions of the military science and soldiery in other works. For example, in The Prince he declares that "a prince should have no other object, no any other thought, nor take anything as his art but that of war and its orders and discipline; for that is the only art which is of concern to one who commands."

In the course of the sixteenth century twenty-one editions appeared and it was translated into French, English, German, and Latin. Montaigne named Machiavelli next to Caesar, Polybius, and Commynes as an authority on military affairs. Although in the seventeenth century changing military methods brought other writers to the fore, Machiavelli was still frequently quoted. In the eighteenth century, the Marshal de Saxe leaned heavily on him when he composed his Reveries upon the Art of War (1757), and Algarotti—though without much basis—saw in Machiavelli the master who has taught Frederick the Great the tactics by which he astounded Europe. Like most people concerned with military matters, Jefferson had Machiavelli's Art of War in his library, and when the War of 1812 increased American interest in problems of war, The Art of War was brought out in a special American edition."

This continued interest in Machiavelli as a military thinker was not only caused by the fame of his name; some of the recommendations made in the Art of War—those on training, discipline, and classification, for instance—gained increasing practical importance in early modern Europe when armies came to be composed of professionals coming from the most different social strata. This does not mean that the progress of military art in the sixteenth century—in drilling, in dividing an army into distinct units, in planning and organizing campaigns-was due to the influence of Machiavelli. Instead, the military innovators of the time were pleased to find a work in which aspects of their practice were explained and justified. Moreover, in the sixteenth century, with its wide knowledge of ancient literature and its deep respect for classical wisdom, it was commonly held that the Romans owed their military triumphs to their emphasis on discipline and training. Machiavelli's attempt to present Roman military organization as the model for the armies of his time was therefore not regarded as extravagant. At the end of the sixteenth century, for instance, Justus Lipsius, in his influential writings on military affairs, also treated the Roman military order as a permanently valid model.

Themes
The content and format of The Art of War are strangely at odds. In the opening pages, after Cosimo has described his grandfather's inspiration for gardens in which the conversations are set, Fabrizio declaims that we should imitate ancient warfare rather than ancient art forms. However, the Art of War is a dialogue in the humanist tradition of imitating classical forms. Machiavelli himself appears to have fallen into the trap for which Fabrizio criticizes Bernardo Rucellai. Despite this inherent contradiction, the book lacks much of the cynical tone and humour that is so characteristic of Machiavelli's other works.

References

External links

 Notable Quotes and Aphorisms from Art Of War
 The Art of War and other writings
 Machiavelli's The Art Of War at Project Gutenberg
 Tudor Translation (1560 in a 1905 ed.) and Neville Translation (1675).
  (Neville Translation)
 

1521 books
Machiavellianism
Military strategy books
Socratic dialogues
Works by Niccolò Machiavelli